Agbinika Power Station is a  proposed mini hydroelectric power project in Uganda.

Location
The power station will be located across Kochi River, at the current location of Agbinika Falls in Kochi Sub-county, in Yumbe District, in West Nile, Northern Uganda. This location lies near the town of Yumbe, close to the borders with the Democratic Republic of the Congo and South Sudan. The approximate coordinates of Agbinika Falls are:3°30'00.0"N, 31°11'51.0"E (Latitude:3.5000; Longitude:31.1975). The coordinates are approximate because Agbinika Falls does not show on most publicly available maps.

Overview
In February 2013, Ugandan print media reported that Uganda's president, Yoweri Museveni, had verbally agreed for his government to construct the Agbinika Power Station to supply power to the West Nile sub-region, in conjunction with the Nyagak Power Stations I, II, and III. The planned capacity  of the Agbinika station is 20 megawatts.

Construction timetable
At this time, the construction time-table is not yet publicly known.

Construction costs
The estimated cost of constructing this power station is unknown at this time. The construction of the 5 MW Nyagak III Power Station in nearby Zombo District is anticipated to cost approximately US$14 million. Using that bench mark, Agbinika Power Station may cost approximately US$65 to US$75 million.

See also

List of power stations in Uganda
List of hydropower stations in Africa
List of hydroelectric power stations

References

External links
 Nyagak II Power Station Under Construction

Proposed renewable energy power stations in Uganda
Hydroelectric power stations in Uganda
Yumbe District